Josiah Parsons Cooke (October 12, 1827 – September 3, 1894) was an American scientist who worked at Harvard University and was instrumental in the measurement of atomic weights, inspiring America's first Nobel laureate in chemistry, Theodore Richards, to pursue similar research. Cooke's 1854 paper on atomic weights has been said to foreshadow the periodic law developed later by Mendeleev and others. Historian I. Bernard Cohen described Cooke "as the first university chemist to do truly distinguished work in the field of chemistry" in the United States.

Life and work
Josiah Parsons Cooke was born in Boston, Massachusetts in 1827. He attended Boston Latin School and as a teenager set up his own chemical laboratory, partly due to an interest sparked by lectures of Yale's Benjamin Silliman. The teaching of chemistry at Harvard was in poor shape at this time, so after Cooke entered the university in 1843 he continued to be largely self-taught in the subject. Cooke graduated from Harvard in 1848 with an A.B., and became a mathematics tutor there the following year. In 1850 he was elected the Erving Professor of Chemistry and Mineralogy at Harvard, although he had had little formal education in chemistry.

Reversing the modern order, after Cooke obtained his professorship he embarked on a plan of advanced study, spending eight months in Europe attending the lectures of Dumas and Regnault. On returning to the United States, Cooke began in earnest to raise the standard of chemical education at Harvard, introducing required courses in chemistry, accompanied by laboratory instruction. He was one of the first, if not the very first, in the United States to use laboratory work to teach chemistry.

Cooke's first publication was in 1852, a study of an arsenic crystal. This was followed by investigations of the atomic weights of arsenic and other elements. In 1857 he published a collection of chemical problems for use of the undergraduates of Harvard College with reference to the Elements of Chemistry by Julius Adolph Stöckhardt. By 1862 Cooke also was publishing in the new field of spectroscopy. He studied crystals throughout his career, and the mineral "cookeite", an aluminosilicate quartz, is named after him. In addition to his research efforts, Cooke taught a course in introductory chemistry for over forty years and was, by all accounts, quite successful at it. According to Jackson, Cooke published forty-one scientific papers based on his research and thirty-two on other subjects, along with at least eight books.

Among the areas in which Cooke took an interest and published in was the relationship between religion and science.

Cooke married Mary H. Huntington in 1860; the couple had no children. He died in 1894 in Newport, Rhode Island, and was buried at the Mount Auburn Cemetery.

Selected writings

Activities and honors
 National Academy of Sciences, elected a member in 1872
 Associate editor, American Journal of Science, 1877
 Doctor of Laws, honorary degree, University of Cambridge, 1882
 Fellow of the American Academy of Arts and Sciences, 1853; President, 1892–1894

References

External links

 Obituary – from The New York Times
 Obituary from The Harvard Crimson (1894)
 
 
 
 National Academy of Sciences Biographical Memoir
 
 
Josiah Parsons Cooke biography in Scientific American

1827 births
1894 deaths
American chemists
Fellows of the American Academy of Arts and Sciences
Harvard College alumni
Harvard University faculty
People from Boston
Members of the United States National Academy of Sciences
Boston Latin School alumni